David A. Winter (PhD, PEng) is a distinguished professor emeritus of the University of Waterloo. He was a founding member of the Canadian Society for Biomechanics and its first Career Award winner. He was later awarded the Muybridge Medal of the International Society of Biomechanics (ISB) and the Lifetime Achievement Award of The Gait and Clinical Movement Analysis Society. Before becoming an academic he served as an electrical officer with the Royal Canadian Navy on HMCS Nootka from 1952 to 1958. He completed his service at the rank of lieutenant commander. In December 2011, ISB named an award to encourage young people to stay involved in biomechanics research the "David Winter Young Investigator Award."

Winter is notable for introducing many important methods and concepts to the study of human locomotion and balance, such as automated television motion capture, lowpass digital filtering of marker trajectories, measurement of instantaneous segmental energy, and the powers produced by joint moments of force, and the analysis of electromyograms by ensemble averaging.

Education
BSc, Electrical Engineering, Queen's University, 1953
MSc, Electrical Engineering, Queen's University, 1961
PhD, Physiology & Biophysics, Dalhousie University, 1967

Academic posts
Winter started his academic career in 1961 as an assistant professor in electrical engineering at the Royal Military College in Kingston, Ontario. He then took up a similar position at the Technical University of Nova Scotia where was eventually promoted to professor in 1969. In 1969, he became director of biomedical engineering at the Shriner's Hospital in Winnipeg with an associate professorship in surgery at the University of Manitoba and an adjunct professorship in electrical engineering. He was then hired as associate professor in the Department of Kinesiology at the University of Waterloo in 1974. He was promoted to professor in 1976, and when he retired in 1995 was given the title of distinguished professor emeritus.

Textbooks
David A. Winter. (2009). Biomechanics and Motor Control of Human Movement, Fourth Edition. Published by John Wiley & Sons, New York. .
David A. Winter and Aftab E. Patla. (1997). Signal Processing and Linear Systems for the Movement Sciences. Published by Waterloo Biomechanics.
David A. Winter. (1995). A.B.C. (Anatomy, Biomechanics and Control) of Balance during Standing and Walking. David A. Winter. Published by Waterloo Biomechanics.
David A. Winter. (1991). The Biomechanics and Motor Control of Human Gait: Normal, Elderly and Pathological, Second Edition. David A. Winter. Published by Waterloo Biomechanics.

Awards and honours
1990, Career Investigators Award, Canadian Society for Biomechanics
1995, Wartenweiler Memorial Lecture, 15th Congress International Society of Biomechanics
1996, Geoffrey Dyson Lecturer, International Society of Biomechanics in Sports, Madeira, June 25
2001, Lifetime Achievement Award, The Gait and Clinical Movement Analysis Society
2001, Muybridge Medal, The International Society of Biomechanics

Additional awards
 1966–1968, Canada Council Fellow in Engineering, Medicine & Science
 1970–1974, President, Canadian Medical and Biological Engineering Society
 1973,	Listed in American Men and Women of Science
 1997, Fellow of Institute of Electrical & Electronic Engineers
 2002, Fellow of Canadian Society for Biomechanics

References 

1930 births
2012 deaths
Canadian academics in engineering
Canadian engineering researchers